Piazza del Duomo is a city square in Siena, Italy.

Buildings around the square
Santa Maria della Scala (Siena)
Siena Cathedral
Palazzo Reale (Siena)

Piazzas in Siena
Odonyms referring to a building
Odonyms referring to religion